The false green robber frog (Eleutherodactylus chlorophenax) is a species of frogs in the family Eleutherodactylidae. It is endemic to the Massif de la Hotte, southwestern Haiti.

Etymology
The specific name chlorophenax is derived from Greek words for "green" and "imposter", the first referring to the prevalent green body color and the latter alluding to the resemblance of this species to Eleutherodactylus inoptatus.

Description
The holotype, an adult male and the only type specimen, measured  in snout–vent length (SVL). This is also the maximum (recorded) size for males, while the maximum female size is  SVL. The head is slightly wider than it is long. The snout is truncate. The tympanum is visible. The dorsum is either green or tan with some green areas. Some individuals have weakly defined dark scapular spots and dorsolateral lines, but otherwise the dorsum is almost without any distinct pattern. The fingers are unwebbed while the toes are slightly webbed. Both fingers and toes are long and bear relatively large discs.

Habitat and conservation
The range of this species is suffering from severe habitat destruction, primarily due to logging for charcoal production by local people and by slash-and-burn agriculture. Its range overlaps with the Pic Macaya National Park, but the park is not managed for conservation.

References

chlorophenax
Amphibians of Haiti
Endemic fauna of Haiti
Amphibians described in 1976
Taxa named by Albert Schwartz (zoologist)
Taxonomy articles created by Polbot